The FS Line chair is a product of Wilkhahn, designed by Klaus Franck and Werner Sauer in 1980. The chair is named after its two designers. This was the first single piece, highly flexible seat shell manufactured by Wilkhahn  

This ergonomically designed chair featured a synchronised mechanism, which adjusts the position of the seat and backrest to flexibly accommodate the needs of person. This chair also features upholstery fitted like a tyre on a rim. After nearly three decades, this chair is still in production.

References

Chairs
Individual models of furniture